DJ Layla is a Romanian music project, produced by Radu Sirbu (O-Zone) and Sianna. The 2009 single "Single Lady" (feat. Romanian singer Alissa) won the "Most airplayed songs 2009" at Radio România Actualităţi Awards and reached the top 40 charts in Romania, Moldova and Russia.

Albums 
 2010 - Single Lady
 2021 - Focus On Music

Singles 
 2008 - "Single Lady" (feat. Alissa)
 2009 - "City Of Sleeping Hearts" (feat. Dee-Dee & Radu Sârbu)
 2010 - "Planet Mars" (feat. Dee-Dee & Radu Sârbu)
 2010 - "Drive" (feat. Dee-Dee & Radu Sârbu)
 2011 - "Party Boy" (feat. Armina Rosi & Radu Sârbu)
 2011 - "I Miss You Baby" (feat. Alex Karbouris)
 2012 - "I'm your angel" (feat. Sianna & Radu Sârbu)
 2013 - "Searching 4 love" (feat. Lorina & Radu Sârbu)
 2013 - "Born to Fly" (feat. Dee-Dee & Radu Sârbu)
 2014 - "Without Your Love" (feat. Sianna)
 2015 - "Kill Me Or Kiss Me" (feat. NesteA)
 2015 - "I Need LOVE" (feat. Sianna)
 2016 - "Don't Blame my Heart (feat. Lorina)
 2016 - "Don't Go" (feat. Malina Tanase) 
 2016 - "In Your Eyes" (feat. Sianna)
 2017 - "Ocean Of Lies" (feat. Mihai Popistasu)
 2018 -  "Just Call Me To Say" (feat. Malina Tanase)
 2018 -  "Love Is Calling" (feat. Sianna)
 2019 -  "City of Love"

References

External links

 Page on Discogs

Living people
Moldovan DJs
Musicians from Chișinău
Year of birth missing (living people)